Traveling in Sin is a memoir by American authors Lisa Ellen Niver and George Rajna of We Said Go Travel that is written in the voices of the story's two leading protagonists, who met on-line in January 2007.

Background
After exchanging emails and dating, the couple travels to Fiji over the summer of 2008 where George reveals his lifelong dream to travel the world for a year and urges Lisa to join him. With much convincing, the duo embarks on a journey that takes them from French Polynesia to New Zealand and Australia. From that point on, the "true" adventure begins as they journey by land across vast portions of Asia, covering Indonesia to Mongolia. During these adventures, Lisa shrinks down to her waist size while developing her inner courage and belief in herself; George learns to open up his heart to form a team-based relationship that leads to a culminating special proposal.

Contents
Peppered with humorous characters, tears of joy and disaster, and different realities related to their varied social strata and travel style, Niver and Rajna meander around Asia seeing the sights, building their relationship and returning triumphant to the United States in love and excited about their imminent wedding. They both took a leap when leaving their jobs, home, cat and cultural clutter, and land together as a team with a new life. It has been said that "the book is a must-read for anyone who dreams of traveling the world."

References

External links
We Said Go Travel website 

2013 non-fiction books
American memoirs
American travel books
Books about Asia
Books about Australia
Books about Brunei
Books about Cambodia
Books about China
Books about Indonesia
Books about Laos
Books about Malaysia
Books about Mongolia
Books about New Zealand
Books about Oceania
Books about Vietnam